Alexander Gordon (1635 in Aberdeen Scotland – 1697), fought as a Royalist and was captured by Oliver Cromwell's army at the Battle of Worcester on 3 September 1651 at the end of the English Civil War. He was imprisoned at Tothill Field outside London over the winter of 1651–1652. He was transported to the New World in 1652 and entered into indentured servitude. His later victory over servitude became the legal precedent in Massachusetts.

The Alexander Gordon line is the earliest Gordon family in the New World according to the Gordon Genealogy DNA Project, and descends from Adam de Gordoun through Sir William Gordon 1265 Laird of Strathbogie (now Huntly).

Along with many other Scottish prisoners, he sailed on the ship "Liberty", commanded by Capt. James Allen to Boston, and was confined at Watertown as a prisoner of war.

For a year or more Alexander remained with John Cloyes, a boatswain, or mate, of the vessel living in Cambridge on the road to Watertown—near the site of Cambridge Hospital today.

While there he formed an acquaintance with Samuel Stratton of Watertown, with whom he made a six-year contract on 25 April 1653, as an apprentice, to learn the art of husbandry. This contract should have ended in 1659, but after a year's work without pay, Cloyes sold Alexander's indenture to Samuel Stratton in Watertown as a "husbandry apprentice."

The term apprentice was used in name only. As news of the first consignment spread, further consignments of this virtually free workforce were shipped to America and used in the towns of Massachusetts and adjacent provinces. These "apprentices" were sold to planters and mill owners; the usual term of service was six years.

Those who engaged in such traffic obscured it with the euphemism "apprenticeship." The idea was that this label would encourage the masters not to drive their helpless servants to the point of ill treatment.

On 3 November 1663, through the kindness of a resident of Cambridge, Alexander appealed again to the court in Massachusetts and was released from his contract. His six-year contract with Samuel Stratton ended on paper in 1659. But Alexander was forced to continue working until November 1663 when he won his freedom in a landmark court case in Massachusetts.

Alexander made his way to New Hampshire, where in the company of other Scots ex-prisoners, he helped found the town of Exeter. He found employment at the sawmill of Nicholas Lisson.

At 28, Alexander Gordon married the owner's daughter, Mary Lisson (19) and became the forefather of the extensive Gordon family in New England.

Notable New Hampshire Gordons descending from Alexander include U.S. Representative for New Hampshire William Gordon, Rhode Island State Representative Daniel P. Gordon Jr., and founder of Gordon College (Massachusetts), Adoniram Judson Gordon.

Alexander Gordon died in 1697.

References
 "Scottish Emigrants to the U.S.A. 1972", Donald Whyte
 "Genealogical History of the Earldom of Southerland", Edinburg Scotland, 1813 by Baronet Gordonstoun
 "Scotch Deported To New England, 1651-52", Massachusetts Historical Society, vol. 61, p. 1927-1928.
 "History of the Town of Exeter, New Hampshire" 1888 by Charles H. Bell
 "History of Saco and Biddeford" 1830 by George Folsom
 "Alexander Gordon and His Descendants" 1999 by Marion Otis
 The Gordon family of Maine and New Hampshire. (Maine: Daughters of the American Revolution, 1946) by Blanche Gordon Cobb.

External links
Alexander Gordon and his descendant's contributions are featured prominently in Bell's "History of Exeter, New Hampshire", "Alexander Gordon and His Descendants" by Marion Otis, and on the Gordons of Maine site at Gordons of Maine .
One great-great-grandson of Alexander was John True Gordon of Thorndike, Maine. He became the last man hanged in Maine – for a crime he did not commit. The Thorndike Slayer

1635 births
Scottish slaves
1697 deaths
People from Aberdeen
Scottish soldiers
Cavaliers
Kingdom of Scotland emigrants to the Thirteen Colonies
17th-century slaves